Clelia Ailara (born 30 April 1972) is an Italian softball player who competed in the 2000 Summer Olympics.

References

1972 births
Living people
Italian softball players
Olympic softball players of Italy
Softball players at the 2000 Summer Olympics
Place of birth missing (living people)